North Yuba may refer to:
 North Yuba AVA, an American Viticultural Area in Yuba County, California, USA.
 North Yuba River, in California

See also
 Yuba (disambiguation)